Tianzhong Township is an urban township located at eastern Changhua County, Taiwan. Its former name and current name make reference to the origin of the town in the center of rice paddies.

Geography

Tianzhong encompasses  with a population of 39,701 as of January 2023. Most of the township is part of Changhua Plain, with the Bagua Mountain Range to the east.

Administrative divisions
The township comprises 22 villages: Beilu, Bifeng, Dalun, Dashe, Dingtan, Fuxing, Longtan, Meizhou, Nanlu, Pinghe, Sanan, Sanguang, Sanmin, Shalun, Tunglu, Tungyuan, Xiangshan, Xilu, Xinmin, Xinzhuang, Zhonglu and Zhongtan.

Festivals
 Clay Sculpture Festival

Transportation

Rail

 THSR Changhua Station
 TRA Tianzhong Station

Bus
 Tianzhong Bus Station of Changhua Bus
 Tianzhong Bus Station of Yuanlin Bus

Notable natives
 Cho Po-yuan, Magistrate of Changhua County (2005-2014)
 Huang Jong-tsun, President of Examination Yuan
 Richie Jen, actor and singer

References

External links

  

Townships in Changhua County